Lola (Dolores) Iturbe (Barcelona, 1 August 1902 – Gijón, 5 January 1990) was a prominent Spanish anarcho-syndicalist, trade unionist, activist, and journalist during the Second Spanish Republic, and a member of the French Resistance during the Battle of France. She co-founded the anarcho-feminist movement, Mujeres Libres, and of the Comité de Milicias Antifascistas during the Spanish Civil War.

Biography
Working as a maid since childhood, she was self-taught. Iturbe was a member of the Confederación Nacional del Trabajo (CNT). In 1921, she was joined by the anarchist, Juan Manuel Molina Mateo ("Juanel"). She was one of the founders of the anarcho-feminist movement, Mujeres Libres and of the Comité de Milicias Antifascistas during the Spanish Civil War. She met Émilienne Morin in Brussels in 1928. She chronicled the war for Tierra y Libertad from the Aragón front. At the end of the conflict, she and Juanel, a former secretary-general of the Federación Anarquista Ibérica, were exiled to France.  Together, they formed part of the French Resistance.

References

Bibliography 

 Fontanillas, Antonia & Torres, Sonya. Lola Iturbe. Vida e ideal de una luchadora anarquista. Virus Editorial, Colección Acracia, Barcelona 2006. 

1902 births
1990 deaths
People from Barcelona
Confederación Nacional del Trabajo members
Anarchists from Catalonia
Spanish activists
Spanish women activists
Journalists from Catalonia
Spanish women journalists
Anarcho-syndicalists
Anarchist writers
Mujeres Libres
Spanish trade unionists
Women trade unionists
Organization founders
Women founders
Spanish Anti-Francoists